Poblana squamata, the Quechulac silverside, is a species of neotropical silverside endemic to Mexico.

References

squamata
Endemic fish of Mexico
Fish described in 1950
Taxonomy articles created by Polbot
Oriental Basin